Piracetam is a drug marketed as a treatment for myoclonus. It is also used as a cognitive enhancer to improve memory, attention, and learning. Evidence to support its use is unclear, with some studies showing modest benefits in specific populations and others showing minimal or no benefit. Piracetam is sold as a medication in many European countries. Sale of piracetam is not illegal in the United States, although it is not regulated nor approved by the FDA so it is legally sold for research use only.

Piracetam is in the racetams group, with chemical name 2-oxo-1-pyrrolidine acetamide. It is a derivative of the neurotransmitter GABA and shares the same 2-oxo-pyrrolidone base structure with pyroglutamic acid. Piracetam is a cyclic derivative of GABA (gamma-aminobutyric acid). Related drugs include the anticonvulsants levetiracetam and brivaracetam, and the putative nootropics aniracetam and phenylpiracetam.

Efficacy

Dementia
A 2001 Cochrane review concluded that there was not enough evidence to support piracetam for dementia or cognitive problems. A 2005 review found some evidence of benefit in older subjects with cognitive impairment. In 2008, a working group of the British Academy of Medical Sciences noted that many of the trials of piracetam for dementia were flawed.

There is no good evidence that piracetam is of benefit in treating vascular dementia.

Depression and anxiety
Some sources suggest that piracetam's overall effect on lowering depression and anxiety is higher than on improving memory. However, depression is reported to be an occasional adverse effect of piracetam.

Other
Piracetam may facilitate the deformability of erythrocytes in capillary which is useful for cardiovascular disease.

Peripheral vascular effects of piracetam have suggested its use potential for vertigo, dyslexia, Raynaud's phenomenon and sickle cell anemia. There is no evidence to support piracetam's use in sickle cell crisis prevention or for fetal distress during childbirth. There is no evidence for benefit of piracetam with acute ischemic stroke, though there is debate as to its utility during stroke rehabilitation.

Anti-vasospasm
Piracetam has been found to diminish erythrocyte adhesion to vascular wall endothelium, making any vasospasm in the capillary less severe. This contributes to its efficacy in promoting microcirculation, including to the brain and kidneys.

Side effects
Symptoms of general excitability, including anxiety, insomnia, irritability, headache, agitation, nervousness, tremor, and hyperkinesia, are occasionally reported. Other reported side effects include somnolence, weight gain, clinical depression, weakness, increased libido, and hypersexuality.

According to a 2005 review, piracetam has been observed to have the following side effects: hyperkinesia, weight gain, nervousness, somnolence, depression and asthenia.

Piracetam reduces platelet aggregation as well as fibrinogen concentration, and thus is contraindicated to patients with cerebral hemorrhage.

Toxicity
The  for oral consumption in humans has not been determined. The LD50 is 5.6 g/kg for rats and 20 g/kg for mice, indicating extremely low acute toxicity. For comparison, in rats the LD50 of vitamin C is 12 g/kg and the LD50 of table salt is 3 g/kg.

Mechanisms of action
Piracetam's mechanism of action, as with racetams in general, is not fully understood. The drug influences neuronal and vascular functions and influences cognitive function without acting as a sedative or stimulant. Piracetam is a positive allosteric modulator of the AMPA receptor, although this action is very weak and its clinical effects may not necessarily be mediated by this action. It is hypothesized to act on ion channels or ion carriers, thus leading to increased neuron excitability. GABA brain metabolism and GABA receptors are not affected by piracetam

Piracetam improves the function of the neurotransmitter acetylcholine via muscarinic cholinergic (ACh) receptors, which are implicated in memory processes. Furthermore, piracetam may have an effect on NMDA glutamate receptors, which are involved with learning and memory processes. Piracetam is thought to increase cell membrane permeability. Piracetam may exert its global effect on brain neurotransmission via modulation of ion channels (i.e., Na+, K+). It has been found to increase oxygen consumption in the brain, apparently in connection to ATP metabolism, and increases the activity of adenylate kinase in rat brains. Piracetam, while in the brain, appears to increase the synthesis of cytochrome b5, which is a part of the electron transport mechanism in mitochondria. But in the brain, it also increases the permeability of some intermediates of the Krebs cycle through the mitochondrial outer membrane.

Piracetam inhibits N-type calcium channels. The concentration of piracetam achieved in central nervous system after a typical dose of 1200 mg (about 100 μM) is much higher than the concentration necessary to inhibit N-type calcium channels (IC50 of piracetam in rat neurons was 3 μM).

History
Piracetam was first made some time between the 1950s and 1964 by Corneliu E. Giurgea. There are reports of it being used for epilepsy in the 1950s.

Society and culture
In 2009 piracetam was reportedly popular as a cognitive enhancement drug among students.

Legal status
Piracetam is an uncontrolled substance in the United States meaning it is legal to possess without a license or prescription.

Regulatory status
In the United States, piracetam is not approved by the Food and Drug Administration. Piracetam is not permitted in compounded drugs or dietary supplements in the United States. Like most research chemicals, it has been available over-the-counter, self-regulated, and third-party lab tested by many US companies for decades.

In the United Kingdom, piracetam is approved as a prescription drug Prescription Only Medicine (POM) number is PL 20636/2524 for adult with myoclonus of cortical origin, irrespective of cause, and should be used in combination with other anti-myoclonic therapies.

In Japan piracetam is approved as a prescription drug.

Piracetam has no DIN in Canada, and thus cannot be sold but can be imported for personal use in Canada.

In Hungary, piracetam was a prescription-only medication, but as of 2020, no prescription is required and piracetam is available as an over-the-counter drug under the name Memoril Mite, and is available in 600 mg pills.

See also 
 AMPA receptor positive allosteric modulator
 Aniracetam
 Brivaracetam—an analogue of piracetam with the same additional side chain as levetiracetam and a three–carbon chain. It exhibits greater antiepileptic properties than levetiracetam in animal models, but with a somewhat smaller, although still high, therapeutic range.
 Hydergine
 Levetiracetam—an analogue of piracetam bearing an additional CH3–CH2– sidechain and bearing antiepileptic pharmacological properties through a poorly understood mechanism probably related to its affinity for the vesicle protein SV2A.
 Oxiracetam
 Phenylpiracetam—a phenylated analog of the drug piracetam which was developed in 1983 in Russia where it is available as a prescription drug.
 Pramiracetam

References

External links 

 

Acetamides
AMPA receptor positive allosteric modulators
Racetams
Nootropics